is a Japanese television series. It had a first season in 1993 and a second season, titled Hitotsu Yane no Shita 2, in 1997. It was very popular in Japan, with its highest rating being 34 percent and it was also exported to other regions in East Asia. It features Yōsuke Eguchi, Noriko Sakai and Masaharu Fukuyama as its leading characters.

Plot
Seven years ago, the Kashiwagi couple were killed in a car accident. They left behind six children, who were forced to live in different families. Tatsuya Kashiwagi, the eldest son, was a marathon runner. After retiring due to injuries, he opened a small laundry shop and was ready to marry his coach's daughter. However, his biggest wish is to find his five separated siblings and form a family together, but the six brothers and sisters grew apart over 7 years. While Tatsuya is very eager in uniting the family, his siblings, with the exception of the eldest daughter Koyuki, are apathetic towards his suggestion. They also have very different lives, one son is the heir to a big hospital - owned by his foster father, another is a juvenile delinquent, etc. The youngest brother was also disabled in an accident. In spite of these challenges, Tatsuya still decides to reunite the family so that they can live "under one roof". To accomplish this wish, he overcame various difficulties, and even sacrificed his own marriage prospects.

Characters
 Yōsuke Eguchi portrays Tatsuya "Anchan" Kashiwagi, the eldest son. He used to be a professional marathon runner, but was forced to retire after tearing his Achilles tendon. He is the guardian of the family. Despite his short temper, he is a genuinely caring person, especially concerning his siblings.
 Masaharu Fukuyama portrays Masaya "Chii-nii-chan" Kashiwagi, the second son. After his parents' accident, he was adopted by a wealthy doctor, Kiuchi Yuuzo. He studied hard to meet the expectations of his foster family, and his foster father later decided to let him inherit his private hospital in the future. In contrast with Tatsuya, Masaya has a calm and mature disposition.
 Noriko Sakai portrays Koyuki Kashiwagi, the elder adopted daughter of the Kashiwagi family. After the accident, she was adopted by relatives and later moved out to live alone after her foster parents divorced. She had an affair with the manager at her workplace. After Tatsuya's wedding was called off, she resigned and moved into the Kashiwagi family to take care of her siblings. She assists Tatsuya in his laundry shop.
Issei Ishida portrays Kazuya Kashiwagi, the third son. He dropped out of high school, and was a delinquent, once having gone through a juvenile detention center. After returning to the Kashiwagi family, he turns a new leaf and works hard. His character is similar to that of Tatsuya's. Being headstrong, he often quarrels with Tatsuya. He is talkative, except around women.
 Megumi Ōji portrays Koume Kashiwagi, the fifth child and the younger daughter. After being adopted by her relatives, she was not on good terms with the relative's daughter and was often bullied. Nevertheless, she is a hard worker and eventually gets into college.
 Koji Yamamoto portrays Fumiya Kashiwagi, the youngest son. His legs were injured in an accident. Subsequently, he was sent to a nursing home by his foster family and was mistakenly thought to have autism. Tatsuya found him and took him back in. Back home he overcame his sense of inferiority and started showing his skill with drawing, and he aims to become a painter. He is a tender and resilient boy.
 Yuki Uchida portrays Rina Hiyoshi, a famous theater actress. She was hospitalized due to a heart attack, and became friends with Masaya. She ignores her doctors' advice to not overexert herself, and dies while still onstage.

Episode titles and viewership

Season 1 -

Season 2 -

External links

1993 Japanese television series debuts
1993 Japanese television series endings
1997 Japanese television series debuts
1997 Japanese television series endings
1990s Japanese television series
Fuji TV dramas
Television shows written by Shinji Nojima